Tal Cual is a Venezuelan newspaper. It was launched in 2000, with Teodoro Petkoff as editor. It has been described as a leftist newspaper that is critical of the Venezuelan government.

References

External links
Official website

Newspapers established in 2000
Spanish-language newspapers
Newspapers published in Venezuela
2000 establishments in Venezuela
Mass media in Caracas